The men's 200 metre butterfly event for the 1976 Summer Olympics was held in Montreal, Quebec, Canada. The event took place on 18 July.

Heats
Heat 1

Heat 2

Heat 3

Heat 4

Heat 5

Heat 6

Final

References

External links
Official Olympic Report

Swimming at the 1976 Summer Olympics
Men's events at the 1976 Summer Olympics